The Idea of Perfection is a 1999 novel by Australian author Kate Grenville.

Notes

"Dedication: For Tom and for Alice with love"
"Epigraph: 'An arch is two weaknesses which together make a strength.' - Leonardo da Vinci "

Awards and nominations

Orange Prize for Fiction, 2001: winner

External links

Reviews
"The Australian Public Intellectual Network" 
"Australian Women's Book Review 
"Orange Prize Project" weblog 

1999 Australian novels
Women's Prize for Fiction-winning works